"Pause" is a single by Jay Dee that was chosen to lead his 2001 album, Welcome 2 Detroit. Besides a grunt and an ad-lib, ("Bounce"), Jay Dee doesn't perform on the song himself, but instead features his friends Frank-N-Dank, who brace the horn-laced track with suitably over-the-top braggadocio. Much of Dank's opening first is later featured in scratches on Dilla's Ruff Draft EP song "Let's Take It Back".

The appropriately titled "Featuring Phat Kat" sees his one time fellow 1st Down member Phat Kat on the mic, while Jay Dee provides a subdued, but gritty canvas for him to let loose.  The song is also notable for featuring one of Jay Dee's DJ Premier-esque scratch montages.

Track listing
Side A:
Pause (feat. Frank-N-Dank) (Clean)
Pause (feat. Frank-N-Dank) (Dirty)
Pause (Instrumental)
Side B:
Featuring Phat Kat (feat. Phat Kat) (Clean)
Featuring Phat Kat (feat. Phat Kat) (Clean)
Featuring Phat Kat (Instrumental)

2001 songs
J Dilla songs
Songs written by J Dilla